Lambda Phi Xi Multicultural Sorority, Inc. (also known as Lady Xi) is a non-profit, social and service multicultural sorority founded on January 27, 2004 at Michigan State University and Purdue University Calumet.

History
Lambda Phi Xi Multicultural Sorority was established in the spring of 2004. Lambda Phi Xi has joint Founding birthplaces at Michigan State University and Purdue University Calumet respectively.

Lambda Phi Xi became incorporated on June 11, 2005, forever changing its name to Lambda Phi Xi Multicultural Sorority, Inc.

Chapters
Active chapters noted in bold, inactive chapters noted in italics.

Past National Presidents/Executive Directors

References

External links
 

Fraternities and sororities in the United States
Student organizations established in 2004
2004 establishments in Michigan
2004 establishments in Indiana